The badminton men's team tournament at the 2006 Asian Games in Doha took place from 30 November to 5 December at Aspire Hall 3.

Schedule
All times are Arabia Standard Time (UTC+03:00)

Results

League stage

Pool A

Pool B

Pool C

Repechage

Pool D

Knockout stage

Semifinals

Final

Non-participating athletes

References 
Official Website
Asian Games Complete Results

Badminton at the 2006 Asian Games